Madeleine Yrenea "Maddie" Madayag (born February 7, 1998) is a Filipino volleyball player who currently plays for a local club team named Choco Mucho Flying Titans. She was a member of the collegiate varsity women's volleyball team of Ateneo de Manila University. She is a current member of Philippines national team.

Clubs
  Ateneo–Motolite Volleyball Team (2018)
  Choco Mucho Flying Titans (2019–present)

Awards

Individual awards
 2018 Premier Volleyball League Open Conference "1st Best Middle Blocker"
 2019 UAAP Season 81, "Second Best Middle Blocker"

Collegiate
 2015 UAAP Season 77 volleyball tournaments –  Champions, with Ateneo De Manila University Lady Eagles
 2016 UAAP Season 78 volleyball tournaments –  Silver medal, with Ateneo De Manila University Lady Eagles
 2017 UAAP Season 79 volleyball tournaments –  Silver medal, with Ateneo De Manila University Lady Eagles
 2018 UAAP Season 80 volleyball tournaments –  Bronze medal, with Ateneo De Manila University Lady Eagles
 2019 UAAP Season 81 volleyball tournaments –  Champions, with Ateneo De Manila University Lady Eagles

Club
 2018 Premier Volleyball League Open Conference  –  Runner-up, with Ateneo–Motolite Lady Eagles

References

Filipino women's volleyball players
Sportspeople from Batangas
Living people
University Athletic Association of the Philippines volleyball players
1998 births